The Philadelphia Keystones (also known as the Keystone Club of Philadelphia) were a professional baseball franchise. In 1884, they were a member of the short-lived Union Association. The team was owned by former player Tom Pratt.

The Keystones were managed by catcher Fergy Malone and finished in eighth place in the 12 team league with a 21–46 record. Their top-hitting regular was left fielder / infielder Buster Hoover, who batted .364 with a slugging percentage of .495, and their best pitcher was Jersey Bakley, who was 14–25 with an earned run average of 4.47. Their home games were played at Keystone Park. Jack Clements, who played for 17 seasons and was the last (and virtually the only) left-handed catcher in major league history, made his big-league debut with the Keystones.

Like several other teams in the Union Association, the Keystones did not make it through the entire season, folding after the game of August 7. The entire league ceased operations after 1884, its first and only season.

1860s 
There was an amateur or semi-pro Keystone club in Philadelphia during the 1860s. They generally played their games at the same ballpark as the better-known Athletic ball club. The 1884 team revived the old club name, and both names reference Pennsylvania, "The Keystone State".

1884 season

Season standings

Record vs. opponents

Roster

Player stats

Batting

Starters by position 
Note: Pos = Position; G = Games played; AB = At bats; H = Hits; Avg. = Batting average; HR = Home runs; RBI = Runs batted in

Other batters 
Note: G = Games played; AB = At bats; H = Hits; Avg. = Batting average; HR = Home runs; RBI = Runs batted in

Pitching

Starting pitchers 
Note: G = Games pitched; IP = Innings pitched; W = Wins; L = Losses; ERA = Earned run average; SO = Strikeouts

Relief pitchers 
Note: G = Games pitched; W = Wins; L = Losses; SV = Saves; ERA = Earned run average; SO = Strikeouts

References

External links 
1884 Philadelphia Keystones at Baseball Reference

Union Association baseball teams
Baseball teams established in 1884
Baseball teams disestablished in 1884
1884 establishments in Pennsylvania
1884 disestablishments in Pennsylvania
Defunct baseball teams in Pennsylvania